Wizard, in comics, may refer to:

 Wizard (Archie Comics), an Archie Comics character
 Wizard (DC Comics), a villain from the Golden Age of Comics and a member of the Injustice Society
 Wizard (Marvel Comics), a Fantastic Four villain who has led a number of Frightful Four teams
 Wizard (DC Thomson), a British comic that featured Wilson the Wonder Athlete and was merged to Rover
 Wizard (magazine), a magazine about comic books

See also
 Wizard (disambiguation)
 Aqueduct (comics), a Marvel Comics character also known as the Water Wizard
 Weather Wizard, a DC Comics supervillain